Nossa Senhora do Monte is a freguesia (civil parish) of Cape Verde. It covers the western part of the island of Brava. To its east is the parish of São João Baptista.

Subdivisions
The freguesia consists of the following settlements:
 Campo Baixo
 Cova Joana
 Fajã de Água
 Mato
 Nossa Senhora do Monte (town)
 Tantum
 Tomé Barraz

References

Parishes of Cape Verde
Geography of Brava, Cape Verde